The SEPTA subway–surface trolley lines are a collection of five SEPTA trolley lines that operate on street-level tracks in West Philadelphia and Delaware County, Pennsylvania, and also underneath Market Street in Philadelphia's Center City.

SEPTA's Route 15, the Girard Avenue Line, is another streetcar line that is designated green on route maps but is not part of the subway–surface system.

Like Boston's Green Line and San Francisco's Muni Metro, the SEPTA trolley line is the descendant of a pre-World War II streetcar system. It also shares many similarities with the premetro and stadtbahn systems of continental Europe. Where Boston and San Francisco's systems use longer, articulated LRT vehicles, Philadelphia uses rigid vehicles roughly  longer than the PCC streetcar they replaced. The lines use Kawasaki Type K LRVs delivered in 1981–82. The cars are similar to those on Routes 101 and 102 100 series, SEPTA's suburban trolley routes, which were delivered around the same time. However, the subway–surface cars are single-ended and use trolley poles, while the suburban lines use double ended cars and pantographs for power collection.

Route description

Center City
The subway opened for passenger service December 15, 1906.

Starting from their eastern terminus at 13th Street station near City Hall, the trolleys loop around in a tunnel under City Hall before stopping under Dilworth Park at 15th Street station and then realign back under Market Street.

All five routes also stop at 19th Street, 22nd Street, 30th Street, and 33rd Street, which are all underground stations. From 15th to 30th Streets, they run in the same tunnel as SEPTA's Market–Frankford Line, which runs express on the inner tracks while the trolleys utilize the outer ones.

Passengers may transfer free of charge to the Market–Frankford Line at 13th, 15th, and 30th Streets, as well as to the Broad Street Line at 15th Street. Connections to the Regional Rail are also available via underground passageways connecting 13th and 15th Street stations to Suburban Station, one of the city's main commuter rail terminals.

University City
After traveling under the Schuylkill River, the trolley lines provide access to 30th Street Station, the Philadelphia area's main intercity rail and commuter rail station, located across the street from the trolley and rapid transit station. Connections are available to SEPTA Regional Rail, many Amtrak services, and New Jersey Transit's Atlantic City Line. An underground passageway that connects these two stations was closed in the 1980s due to safety concerns. In 2016, the 30th Street Station District proposed overhauling both 30th Street Station's SEPTA and trolley stations including, by public demand, the reopening the tunnel that connects the two (currently separate) stations. Presently, passengers connecting to and from the subway-surface lines and Market-Franford Line must walk outside to cross the busy 30th Street, and then enter the other station. The timeline called for the tunnel overhaul to be part of Phase 1 and thus completed by 2020.

All routes then stop at 33rd Street, near Drexel University. After this stop, Route 10 diverts from the others and emerges from the tunnel at the 36th Street Portal just south of Market Street, then turns north onto 36th Street and then northwest along Lancaster Avenue and other surface streets. The other four lines make underground stops at 36th and Sansom streets and 37th and Spruce streets on the campus of the University of Pennsylvania before surfacing at the 40th Street Portal near Baltimore Avenue, heading southwest on surface streets.

Points south and west

The Route 11 line travels along Woodland Avenue in Philadelphia and Main Street in Darby. It crosses a CSX Transportation railroad line at grade, one of very few at-grade crossing between a trolley line and a major freight rail line in the United States. (Another belongs to the TECO streetcar system in Tampa, Florida.)

A crash on December 9, 2021, between car 9070 and a CSX freight train resulted in injuries to 7 passengers.

Diversion services
All five trolleys can be diverted onto auxiliary surface tracks west of the 40th Street Portal when tunnels are closed due to maintenance, an accident, or some other obstruction.

Tracks for Route 10 start at Lancaster Avenue (Route 10) and proceed southbound along 40th Street. At Market Street, the line connects to the Market–Frankford Line at its 40th Street station. The surface tracks continue southbound to Spruce Street, where they split either eastbound or westbound. Westbound tracks run to 42nd Street where they turn south to either Baltimore Avenue (Route 34), Chester Avenue (Route 13), or Woodland Avenue (Routes 11 and 36).

Tracks for the other four routes run northbound along 42nd Street, then turning east onto Spruce Street and then north onto 38th Street (US 13). From here, it travels to Filbert Street, then turning left and crossing the 40th Street tracks. When Filbert Street terminates at 41st Street, the tracks turn right, and head north until reaching Lancaster Avenue.

Another set of diversionary trolley tracks begin near the 49th Street Regional Rail station, connecting Chester Avenue to Woodland Avenue (where Routes 11 and 36 separate) by way of 49th Street.

History

The subway–surface lines are remnants of the far more extensive streetcar system that developed in Philadelphia after the arrival of electric trolleys in 1892. Several dozen traction companies were consolidated in 1902 into the Philadelphia Rapid Transit Company. The PRT funneled the West Philadelphia lines into subway tunnels as they approached the city center. After the PRT declared bankruptcy in 1939, it was reopened as the Philadelphia Transportation Company (PTC), which was absorbed into SEPTA in 1968.

In October 2006, University of Pennsylvania's class of 1956 funded the construction of an innovative portal for one of the eastbound entrances of the 37th Street station: a replica of a Peter Witt trolley of the kind manufactured by J. G. Brill and Company from 1923 to 1926. Operated by the Philadelphia Transportation Company, these trolleys brought university students to the campus and to Center City until 1956. Routes 11, 34 and 37 ran through the Penn campus on Woodland Avenue and Locust Streets for nearly 65 years. In 1956, the trolley route was buried to enable the university to unify its campus, with Woodland Avenue and Locust Street becoming pedestrian walkways.

The subway–surface lines operated "Lifeline Service" due to the COVID-19 pandemic. Service on Route 34 resumed on May 17, 2020. Service to the closed stations resumed in June 2020.

In 2021, SEPTA proposed rebranding their rail transit service as "SEPTA Metro", in order to make the system easier to navigate. Under this proposal, the subway–surface lines will be rebranded as the "T" lines with a green color and numeric suffixes for each service. The 10, 34, 13, 11, and 36 would respectively become the T1 Lancaster Avenue, T2 Baltimore Avenue, T3 Chester Avenue, T4 Woodland Avenue, and T5 Elmwood Avenue.

Routes

All routes terminate at 15th Street station between 12:30 a.m. and 5:00 a.m. when 13th Street is closed. On Sunday evenings and during unexpected diversions, all routes are diverted to surface streets and terminate at 40th and Filbert Streets and then are directed to walk a quarter of a block south on 40th Street to the Market-Frankford Line at 40th Street station. Former trolley routes, which have since been replaced with bus service, are shaded in gray.

Routes 11 and 34 do not have overnight service.

See also

 Pennsylvania gauge
SEPTA City Transit Division surface routes
West Philadelphia Streetcar Suburb Historic District

References

External links

SEPTA subway and trolley schedules
Map of subway–surface lines in West Philadelphia
Tramway, Light Railway and LRT in Philadelphia (PublicTransit.US)
Transit Systems in Philadelphia and Southeast Pennsylvania Electric Railway map (Chicago Railfan.net)
WorldNYCSubway.org – SEPTA Subway–Surface Streetcar Lines
A Better Subway Surface System

Railway services introduced in 1906
SEPTA
Subway-Surface Trolley Lines
Subway-Surface Trolley Lines
 
Light rail in Pennsylvania
Streetcars in Pennsylvania
Underground rapid transit in the United States
5 ft 2¼ in gauge railways in the United States
600 V DC railway electrification
1906 establishments in Pennsylvania